Sanbao Township  is a township-level division of Bin County, in the Harbin prefecture-level city of Heilongjiang, China.

See also
List of township-level divisions of Heilongjiang

References

Township-level divisions of Heilongjiang